Shimkent hôtel is a 2003 French fictional film directed and written by Charles de Meaux who co-wrote music score with Vladimir Karoev and Pierre Mikaïloff. It tells the story of a young man who failed a business venture in the Afghan mountains and is suffering from shock in Kazakhstan.

Cast

Romain Duris as  Romain 
Caroline Ducey as  Caroline 
Melvil Poupaud as  Alex 
Thibault de Montalembert as Le Docteur de Montalembert
Yann Collette as  The consul

References

External links

Shimkent hôtel at uniFrance
Shimkent hôtel at Cineuropa

French comedy films
2003 films
2000s French-language films
2000s French films